Gábor Vető (born December 19, 1988) is a Hungarian professional boxer is the former WBC Youth World Lightweight Champion. Since 2010, the native Hungarian has been living in Bern, Switzerland.

Amateur career
Vető was a member of the Hungarian national amateur team and had over 80 amateur bouts.

Professional career
On April 21, 2012, Vető beat the Ugandan Justin Juuko to win the Global Boxing Union World light welterweight title.
On October 15, 2011, Vető beat Michael Kizza to win the vacant Global Boxing Union World and German International  light welterweight titles.
On April 17, 2010, Vető beat Omari Ramadan by T.K.O. to win the WBC Youth World lightweight title.

References

External links

People from Várpalota
Light-welterweight boxers
1988 births
Living people
Hungarian male boxers
Sportspeople from Veszprém County